The Samsung Galaxy A8 Star is a midrange Android smartphone manufactured and marketed by Samsung as part of the Samsung Galaxy A series. It was announced in June 2018 for Southeast Asian markets, namely Korea, China and India. In China, it is sold as the Samsung Galaxy A9 Star.

Availability
The Galaxy A8 Star is intended for Eastern Asian markets, and as such, it is not sold in Western markets. In India, it is available exclusively through Amazon and retails for Rs34990.

Specifications

Hardware
The Galaxy A8 Star has a 6.3" 1080p Super AMOLED display and is powered by the Snapdragon 665. It has dual 24 + 16 MP rear cameras and a 24 MP front camera. The A8 Star relies on USB-C and has a 3.5mm audio jack as well as Bluetooth 5. Biometric options include a rear-mounted fingerprint sensor and facial recognition. Externally, the A8 Star has an aluminum frame with glass on both the front and back of the phone.

Software
The Galaxy A8 Star runs on Android 9 "Pie" and uses One UI 1.1 .

Marketing
Samsung was criticized for using a DSLR to promote the A8 Star's portrait mode effect.

References

Android (operating system) devices
Samsung Galaxy
Samsung smartphones
Mobile phones introduced in 2018
Mobile phones with multiple rear cameras
Discontinued smartphones